Master Mohan Lal is an Indian politician and a member of Bharatiya Janta Party (BJP). He is a former Minister for Transport in Punjab Government.

Early life
His father's name is Neel Kanth.

Political career
He successfully contested election from Pathankot in 1985 as a BJP candidate. He was re-elected in 1997 and 2007.  In 1997 he was made Minister of Forest, Law and legal affairs and also held department of higher education later on in the same tenure. In 2007, he was made Minister for Transport.

References

State cabinet ministers of Punjab, India
Living people
Punjab, India MLAs 1985–1990
Punjab, India MLAs 1997–2002
Punjab, India MLAs 2007–2012
Bharatiya Janata Party politicians from Punjab
1935 births